

Events calendar

+03